Amtar is a small town and rural commune in Chefchaouen Province, Tanger-Tetouan-Al Hoceima, Morocco. At the time of the 2004 census, the commune had a total population of 10,038 people living in 1,459 households. The town's postcode is 91173.

References

Populated places in Chefchaouen Province
Rural communes of Tanger-Tetouan-Al Hoceima